Apteromantis is a genus of praying mantises found in Europe and North Africa.

Species
The Mantodea Species File lists two species:
 Apteromantis aptera
 Apteromantis bolivari - type species

External links

 
Amelidae
Taxonomy articles created by Polbot